The 1780 English cricket season was the ninth in which matches have been awarded retrospective first-class cricket status. The scorecards of four first-class matches have survived. The first six-seam cricket balls were used during the season.

Matches
Four first-class match scorecards survive from 1780, two of them matches between England sides and Hampshire XIs and two between sides organised by John Sackville, 3rd Duke of Dorset and Horatio Mann.

27–28 June – Duke of Dorset's XI v Sir Horatio Mann's XI – Sevenoaks Vine
21–23 August – Sir Horatio Mann's XI v Duke of Dorset's XI – Bourne Paddock
30 August – 1 September – England v Hampshire XI – Bourne Paddock
20–22 September – Hampshire XI v England – Itchin Stoke Down

Four other matches are known to have been played during the season, including one between a Kent XI and a Surrey XI and three involving Berkshire XIs, including one against an Oxfordshire XI.

Other events
Duke & Son of Penshurst made the first six-seam cricket ball during the year. It was presented to the Prince of Wales.

Debutants
 John Freemantle (Hampshire)
 Gibson (Kent)
 Richard Hosmer (Kent)
 Richard Stanford (Kent)
 William Pattenden (Kent)

Other events
Duke & Son of Penshurst made the first six-seam cricket ball and it was presented to the Prince of Wales.

References

Further reading
 
 
 
 
 

1780 in English cricket
English cricket seasons in the 18th century